Mykyta Polyulyakh (born 15 March 1993) is a Ukrainian professional footballer who plays as a midfielder for LNZ Cherkasy.

Career
He played for FC Metalurh Donetsk in the Ukrainian Premier League.

Polyulyakh is product of youth team systems of FC Enerhoyunior Dniprodzerdzhynsk. He made his debut for FC Metalurh entering as a second-half substitute against FC Volyn Lutsk on 21 May 2011 in Ukrainian Premier League.

References

External links
 
 

1993 births
Living people
People from Kamianske
Ukrainian footballers
Ukraine youth international footballers
Association football midfielders
FC Dnipro players
FC Metalurh Donetsk players
FC Stal Alchevsk players
FC Kolkheti-1913 Poti players
FC Kramatorsk players
NK Veres Rivne players
FC LNZ Cherkasy players
Ukrainian Premier League players
Ukrainian First League players
Erovnuli Liga players
Ukrainian expatriate footballers
Expatriate footballers in Georgia (country)
Ukrainian expatriate sportspeople in Georgia (country)
Sportspeople from Dnipropetrovsk Oblast